Coal in India has been mined since 1774, and India is the second largest producer and consumer of coal after China, mining  in FY 2022. Around 30% of coal is imported. Due to high demand and poor average quality, India imports coking coal to meet the requirements of its steel plants. Dhanbad, the largest coal producing city, has been called the coal capital of India. State-owned Coal India had a monopoly on coal mining between its nationalisation in 1973 and 2018.

Most of the coal is burned to generate electricity and most electricity is generated by coal, but coal-fired power plants have been criticised for breaking environmental laws. The health and environmental impact of the coal industry is serious, and phasing out coal would have short-term health and environmental benefits greatly exceeding the costs. Electricity from new solar farms in India is cheaper than that generated by the country's existing coal plants.

History

The Indira Gandhi administration nationalized coal mining in phases – coking coal mines in 1971–72 and non-coking coal mines in 1973. With the enactment of the Coal Mines (Nationalization) Act, 1973, all coal mines in India were nationalized in May 1973. This policy was reversed by the Narendra Modi administration four decades later. In March 2015, the government permitted private companies to mine coal for use in their own cement, steel, power or aluminium plants. The Coking Coal Mines (Nationalization) Act, 1972 and the Coal Mines (Nationalization) Act, 1973 were repealed in January 2018. In the final step toward denationalization, in February 2018, the government permitted private firms to enter the commercial coal mining industry. Under the new policy, mines were auctioned to the firm offering the highest per tonne price. The move broke the monopoly over commercial mining that state-owned Coal India had enjoyed since nationalisation in 1973.

Pre-independence

Commercial exploitation of coal in India began in 1774 with John Sumner and Suetonius Grant Heatly of the East India Company in the Raniganj Coalfield along the Western bank of Damodar River. The growth of Indian coal mining remained slow for nearly a century due to low demand. The introduction of steam locomotives increased coal production to an annual average of 1 million metric tons (1.1 million short tons) in 1853. By 1900, India produced 6.12 million metric tons (6.75 million short tons) of coal per year; by 1920, it produced 18 million metric tons (20 million short tons). During the First World War, coal production received a boost due to increased demand, but declined again in the early 1930s.

In the regions of British India known as Bengal, Bihar and Odisha, the many Indians pioneered Indian involvement in coal mining from 1894. They broke the previous monopolies held by British and other Europeans, establishing many collieries at locations such as Khas Jharia, Jamadoba, Balihari, Tisra, Katrasgarh, Kailudih, Kusunda, Govindpur, Sijua, Sijhua, Loyabad, Dhansar, Bhuli, Bermo, Mugma, Chasnala-Bokaro, Bugatdih, Putki, Chirkunda, Bhowrah, Sinidih, Kendwadih, and Dumka.

Seth Khora Ramji Chawda of Kutch was the first Indian to break the British monopoly in the Jharia Coalfields. Natwarlal Devram Jethwa says that Other Indian communities followed the example of the him in the Dhanbad-Jharia-Bokaro fields after the 1930s. These included the Punjabis, Kutchis, Marwaris, Gujaratis, Bengalis and Hindustanis.

Post-independence

Following independence, the Government of India introduced several 5-year development plans. The National Coal Development Corporation (NCDC), a Government of India Undertaking, was established in 1956 with the collieries owned by the railways. The NCDC aimed to increase coal production efficiently by systematic and scientific development of the coal industry. The Singareni Collieries Company Ltd. (SCCL) which was already in operation since 1945 and which became a Government company under the control of Government of Andhra Pradesh in 1956. The coal industry in India was thus controlled by state-owned companies in the 1950s. Today, SCCL is a joint undertaking of Government of Telangana and Government of India sharing its equity in 51:49 ratio.

Nationalisation of coal mines

Right from its genesis, the commercial coal mining in modern times in India has been dictated by the needs of the domestic consumption. India has abundant domestic reserves of coal. Most of these are in the states of Jharkhand, Odisha, West Bengal, Bihar, Chhattisgarh, Telangana and Madhya Pradesh. On account of the growing needs of the steel industry, a thrust had to be given on systematic exploitation of coking coal reserves in Jharia coalfield. Adequate capital investment to meet the burgeoning energy needs of the country was not forthcoming from the private coal mine owners.

Unscientific mining practices adopted by some of them and poor working conditions of labor in some of the private coal mines became matters of concern for the Government. On account of these reasons, the Central Government took a decision to nationalize the private coal mines. The nationalization was done in two phases, the first with the coking coal mines in 1971–72 and then with the non-coking coal mines in 1973. In October 1971, the Coking Coal Mines (Emergency Provisions) Act, 1971 provided for taking over in public interest of the management of coking coal mines and coke oven plants pending nationalization. This was followed by the Coking Coal Mines (Nationalization) Act, 1972 under which the coking coal mines and the coke oven plants other than those with the Tata Iron & Steel Company Limited and Indian Iron & Steel Company Limited, were nationalized on 1 May 1972 and brought under the Bharat Coking Coal Limited (BCCL), a new Central Government Undertaking. Another enactment, namely the Coal Mines (Taking Over of Management) Act, 1973, extended the right of the Government of India to take over the management of the coking and non-coking coal mines in seven States including the coking coal mines taken over in 1971. This was followed by the nationalization of all these mines on 1 May 1973 with the enactment of the Coal Mines (Nationalization) Act, 1973 which determined the eligibility of coal mining in India.

All non-coking coal mines were nationalized in 1973 and placed under Coal Mines Authority of India. In 1975, Eastern Coalfields Limited, a subsidiary of Coal India Limited, was formed. It took over all the earlier private collieries in Raniganj Coalfield.

The North East Indian states enjoys special privileges under constitution of India. The Sixth Schedule of constitution and article 371 of constitution allows state governments to formulate its own policy to recognize customary tribal laws. For example, Nagaland has its own coal policy which allows its natives to mine coal from their respective lands. Similarly, coal mining in Meghalaya was rampant till imposition of ban on coal mining by National Green Tribunal. The Nagaland Coal and Meghalaya Coal has large buyers in North India, Central India and Eastern India.

Denationalisation of coal mines
Parliament enacted the Coal Mines (Special Provisions) Act, 2015 in March 2015 containing provisions enabling the government to allocate coal mines through auctions. The law also permitted private players to mine coal for use in their own cement, steel, power or aluminium plants. On 20 February 2018, the Cabinet Committee on Economic Affairs (CCEA) permitted private firms to enter the commercial coal mining industry in India. Under the new policy, mines will be auctioned to the firm offering the highest per tonne price. The move broke the monopoly over commercial mining that state-owned Coal India has enjoyed since nationalisation in 1973.

The Coking Coal Mines (Nationalization) Act, 1972 and the Coal Mines (Nationalization) Act, 1973 were repealed by the Repealing and Amending (Second) Act, 2017 on 8 January 2018.

Reserves

India has the fourth largest coal reserves in the world. , India had  of the resource. The total reserves of coal rose 2.36% over the previous year, with the discovery of an estimated . About half of India's coal reserves are proven, 42% are indicated/probable, and 8% are inferred. Coal deposits are primarily found in eastern and south-central India. Jharkhand, Odisha, and Chhattisgarh accounted for almost 70% of the total known coal reserves in India.

The largest lignite reserves are present in Tamil Nadu. Only about 16% of India's lignite reserves are proven, 56% are indicated/probable, and 28% are inferred.

The energy derived from coal in India is about twice that of the energy derived from oil, whereas worldwide, energy derived from coal is about 30% less than energy derived from oil.

Distribution of coal reserves by states

The following table shows the estimated coal reserves in India by state as of 1 April 2021.

Distribution of lignite reserves by states
The following table shows the estimated lignite reserves in India by state as of 1 April 2021.

Production

India is the second largest producer of coal in the world, after China. Production of coal grew by a compound annual growth rate (CAGR) of 3.19%, and production of lignite declined by a CAGR of 1.60% over the last 10 years. Coal mining is one of India's most dangerous jobs.

Washing
Coal washing is an integral part of the coal production process in which raw coal from mines is washed to remove the ash content to make it fit for feeding into boilers such as those in steel plants. Coal washeries are generally not a part of coal mines in India, with some exceptions.

There were 60 coal washeries (19 coking and 41 non-coking) in India as on 31 March 2021 with a total installed capacity of 138.58 million tonnes per year, of which 108.60 million tonnes are non-coking and 29.98 million tonnes are coking coal washeries.

Consumption

India is one of the largest consumers of coal in the world. The country consumed  of coal in 2020–21, of which 79.03% was produced domestically. Coal consumption grew at a compound annual growth rate of 3.96% over the previous decade. Due to high demand and poor average quality, India is forced to import high quality coal to meet the requirements of steel plants. India imported  and exported  of coal in 2020-21. Net imports of coal declined by 13.39% over the previous fiscal. India's net imports of coal grew at a compound annual growth rate of 8.62% over the last 10 years. India is the second largest coal importer in the world, after China.

The electricity sector is the largest consumer of raw coal in India and accounted for 64.07% of the total coal consumed in the country in 2020-21. Other significant consumers include the steel and washery industry (6.65%), the sponge iron industry (1.06%), the cement industry (0.75%), and fertilizers and chemicals (0.19%).

Electricity generation alone accounts for 84.46% of the total lignite consumption. Other significant consumers include the paper industry (5.55%), the cement industry (2.18%) and the textile industry (2.01%). Lignite consumption declined at a compound annual growth rate of 1.30% over the previous decade.

Electricity generation

Coal generated over 73% of electricity produced in 2020–21, while lignite accounted for 3.6% of electricity generation. India's electricity sector consumed over 70% of the coal produced in the country in 2013. In 2020 think tank Carbon Tracker estimated that 17% of coal-fired plants were already more expensive than new renewables and that 85% would be by 2025. It has been suggested that no new coal plants are needed, but that existing plants could be retrofitted to operate more flexibly together with wind and solar.

A large part of Indian coal reserve is similar to Gondwana coal. It is of low calorific value and high ash content. The carbon content is low in India's coal, and toxic trace element concentrations are negligible. The natural fuel value of Indian coal is poor. On average, the Indian power plants using India's coal supply consume about 0.7 kg of coal to generate a kWh, whereas United States thermal power plants consume about 0.45 kg of coal per kWh. This is because of the difference in the quality of the coal, as measured by the Gross Calorific Value (GCV). On average, Indian coal has a GCV of about 4500 Kcal/kg, whereas the quality in most other countries is much better; for example, in Australia, the GCV is 6500 Kcal/kg approximately.

Health effects

The health and environmental impact of the coal industry is serious in India. Additionally, the villages closest to the mine had the greatest incidence of self-reported health problems. Health effects of coal ash are also a problem. Air pollution from coal-fired power plants is linked with asthma, cancer, heart and lung ailments, neurological problems, acid rain, global warming, and other severe environmental and public health impacts.

Environmental effects

In 2020 UN secretary general António Guterres said that India should stop building coal-fired power stations before the end of the year and end fossil fuel subsidies. According to BloombergNEF excluding subsidies the levelized cost of electricity from new large-scale solar power has been below existing coal-fired power stations since 2021.

Coal mafia
The state-owned coal mines of Bihar (now Jharkhand after the division of Bihar state) were among the first areas in India to see the emergence of a sophisticated mafia, beginning with the mining town of Dhanbad. It is alleged that the coal industry's trade union leadership forms the upper echelon of this arrangement and employs caste allegiances to maintain its power. Pilferage and sale of coal on the black market, inflated or fictitious supply expenses, falsified worker contracts and the expropriation and leasing-out of government land have allegedly become routine. A parallel economy has developed with a significant fraction of the local population employed by the mafia in manually transporting the stolen coal for long distances over unpaved roads to illegal mafia warehouses and points of sale.

The coal mafia has had a negative effect on Indian industry, with coal supplies and quality varying erratically. Higher-quality coal is sometimes selectively diverted, and missing coal is replaced with stones and boulders in railway cargo wagons. A human corpse has been discovered in a sealed coal wagon.

Just transition away from coal 

Planning a just transition is important because many poor people rely on coal.

See also 
 Ministry of Coal
 Indian Coal Allocation Scam
 1965 Dhanbad coal mine disaster
 Mining scams in India
 Carr, Tagore and Company

References

Further reading
 Adjusting to transition Brookings Institution

External links
 Center for Research on Energy and Clean Air

 

Coal mining